St Joseph Public School or Pattanakkad Public School (formerly known as CLCP School), is a Higher Secondary School in Pattanakkad, Alappuzha district, Kerala, India. And it is run by a Catholic congregation.

References

High schools and secondary schools in Kerala
Christian schools in Kerala
Schools in Alappuzha district